Església de Sant Pere d'Aixirivall  is a church located in Aixirivall, Sant Julià de Lòria Parish, Andorra. It is a heritage property registered in the Cultural Heritage of Andorra. It was built in 1603.

References

Canillo
Roman Catholic churches in Andorra
Cultural Heritage of Andorra
1603 establishments in Europe